Huggett is a locality in Leduc County, Alberta, Canada.

J. Huggett, an early postmaster, gave the community his last name.

References 

Localities in Leduc County